Transporter (French: Le Transporteur) is a French action thriller film franchise, comprising four films released between 2002 and 2015, and a television series. Jason Statham plays Frank Martin in the first three movies, a professional freelance courier driver for hire. Statham is an accomplished martial artist, allowing him to do all the combat scenes involving Frank Martin himself. This permits the films' signature Hong Kong-style fight scenes, choreographed by Corey Yuen. Chris Vance portrays Frank Martin in the sequel television series and Ed Skrein portrays Frank Martin in the fourth film, a reboot.

Background

Frank Martin
Frank Martin is the protagonist of the films and television series. He is portrayed as a former Special Forces operative who was a team leader of a search and destroy unit, with a military background includes operations "in and out of" Lebanon, Syria and Sudan, as well as a recipient of the Bronze Star in the inaugural film. He retires from service after becoming fatigued and disenchanted with his superior officers, and utilizes his skills as a private driver for hire while maintaining an apparently legitimate life living off of his army pension. Frank Martin operates in accordance with a strict code of conduct, and expects his clients to adhere to his rules.

The character is portrayed with varied backgrounds in different media installments of the franchise. In the television series, it was revealed that he was orphaned as a child, who enlisted in the British Army as an adult and later transferred to Special Air Service. In the film, The Transporter Refueled, his father Frank Martin Sr. is a former British spy, who retired away from London to work on his relationship with his son.

Films

The Transporter (2002)

Frank Martin (Jason Statham) is a highly-skilled driver known only as "The Transporter." He will transport anything, no questions asked, always on time, and he is known as the best in the business. He strictly follows three rules when transporting: Rule Number 1: "Once the deal is made, it is final," Rule Number 2: "No names," and Rule Number 3: "Never open the package." Frank inadvertently breaks his own rule, opens the package and finds a bound and gagged woman. Martin drives a BMW 750i in this film.

Transporter 2 (2005)

Frank has been hired as the driver/chauffeur for a wealthy family, in Miami, Florida. Martin bonds with their young son, whom he drives to school every day. When the boy is kidnapped, Frank must again act in order to protect his young "package" and his family. Eventually, Martin unravels a scheme involving biological weapons and the nefarious Gianni Chellini. Martin is forced to remove a bomb from the bottom of his car by executing an aerial corkscrew manoeuver underneath a crane. The crane catches the bomb and Martin escapes unharmed. Frank debuts the Audi A8 W12 in this film.

Inspector Tarconi plays an even more prominent role in this film. It is established that he and Frank are now friends, and Tarconi goes as far as to lie to the police to cover for Frank. His cooking prowess is established as well.

Transporter 3 (2008)

Frank has been pressured into transporting Valentina (Natalya Rudakova) the kidnapped daughter of Leonid Vasilev (Jeroen Krabbé), the head of the Environmental Protection Agency for Ukraine, from Marseille through Stuttgart and Budapest until he ends up in Odessa on the Black Sea. Along the way, with the help of Inspector Tarconi (François Berléand), Frank has to contend with the people who strong armed him to take the job, agents sent by Vasilev to intercept him, and the general non-cooperation of his passenger, who he realises is the package midway through the film. Despite Valentina's cynical disposition and Frank's resistance to getting involved, Frank and Valentina fall for each other, while escaping from one life-threatening situation after another. Martin again drives an armoured Audi A8 W12 in the film, as well as a BMX bicycle.

The Transporter Refueled (2015)

In May 2013, at the 2013 Cannes Film Festival, a new reboot trilogy was announced with EuropaCorp and China's Fundamental Films co-producing and distributing the titles. The films will likely be budgeted between $30 million to $40 million each and at least one will be shot in China. Luc Besson will co-finance, distribute, produce and write all the films. English actor Ed Skrein replaced Jason Statham as Frank Martin on the fourth installment of the series. The fourth film, The Transporter Refueled, was released in the United States on 4 September 2015 with Camille Delamarre directing.

Collateral (2004)

In an interview with IGN, Louis Leterrier confirmed Jason Statham's cameo appearance in Collateral, providing a briefcase to Vincent (Tom Cruise), as having been a reprisal of Frank Martin.

America: The Motion Picture (2021)

Zebbie Gillese voices Frank Martin / Transporter in the 2021 Netflix original film America: The Motion Picture, in which he is depicted as the stagecoach driver of Benedict "Cosby" Arnold.

Future
The Hollywood Reporter reported in 2013 that EuropaCorp and Fundamental Films will co-finance, produce, and distribute three future installments in the Transporter franchise. The projects would be budgeted from $30 million to $40 million; at least one of the films was likely to be set in China. However no additional information on sequels has been given since the lesser performance 2015's Refueled.

Television

Transporter: The Series (2012-2014)

Transporter: The Series is a television series based on the Transporter films which premiered in 2012 on 11 October in Germany on RTL, and on 6 December in France on M6. Chris Vance took over the role of Frank from Jason Statham and was joined by Hungarian actress Andrea Osvárt, who played Carla, the leading female role in the series, starring as a former Intelligence agent who organises his missions, and French actor François Berléand, the only returning actor from the film series, who reprised his role as Inspector Tarconi.

The series was intended to premiere on Cinemax but they pulled out due to production problems. TNT picked it up and aired both seasons.

Cast and crew

Principal cast

Additional crew

Reception

Box office performance

Critical and public response

References

External links

 
 
 The Original Transporter Movie Website

 
2000s crime thriller films
English-language films
Films adapted into television shows
Films set in France
Films shot in Saint-Tropez
French action thriller films
20th Century Studios franchises
Mass media franchises
2010s crime thriller films
French crime thriller films
Action film franchises
2000s French films
2010s French films